Let's Go! is a Philippine situation comedy on ABS-CBN, set in a college dormitory and targeting a teenaged audience. The show premiered on June 3, 2006, at 4 pm. from July 8, 2006, the show was broadcast on Saturdays at 5 pm. The last episode aired on May 19, 2007.

Cast, characters, and appearance period

Cast table
  = Main cast (credited) 
  = Recurring cast (3+)
  = Guest cast (1-2)

Summary plot (seasons 1-3) 
Norman (Blumark Roces) is the Bisoy boy next door, and is friends with Dennis (Timmy Boy Sta. Maria), who is popular with girls. Dennis is close to the shy girl Junniper (Eda Nolan). Charie (Charee Pineda) is the most attractive girl of the group, and is not intimidated by the bully Badjie (Badjie Mortiz), who is otherwise feared by everyone.

References

External links
 

ABS-CBN original programming
2006 Philippine television series debuts
2007 Philippine television series endings
Philippine comedy television series
2000s college television series
2000s teen sitcoms
Filipino-language television shows
Television series about teenagers